is a subprefecture of Hokkaido Prefecture, Japan.  The subprefecture's capital is Kutchan.  As of July 31, 2004, the estimated population was  256,184 and the area was 4,305.65 km2.

Geography

Municipalities

Mergers

History 
1897: Otaru Subprefecture, Iwanai Subprefecture, and Suttsu Subprefecture were established.
1899: Kutchan Village (now Kutchan Town and Kyōgoku Town), Abuta District were transferred from Muroran Subprefecture (now Iburi Subprefecture) to Iwanai Subprefecture.
1899: Otaru Subprefecture, Iwanai Subprefecture, and Suttsu Subprefecture were merged to form Shiribeshi Subprefecture. Makkari Village (now Makkari Village, Kimobetsu Town, and Rusutsu Village) and Kaributo Village (now Niseko Town), Abuta District were transferred from Muroran Subprefecture.

External links 
Official website 

Subprefectures in Hokkaido